The Adventures of Bob Hope is an American celebrity comics comic book series that was published by National Periodical Publications (an imprint of DC Comics). The series featured stories based on comedian Bob Hope, as well as assorted other humorous stories. The series ran for 109 issues from 1950 through 1968.

Publication history
As 1950 neared, sales for superhero themed comics were declining. National Periodical Publications wanted to diversify its titles and so began licensing the right to use celebrity images, including Jerry Lewis, Dean Martin, Alan Ladd, and Bob Hope. Issue #1 (cover dated February–March 1950) set the tone for most of the 1950s. The lead story would feature Hope in a misadventure similar to his film roles; the back up stories tended to revolve around movie-related themes or characters. For example, issue #1 had a story on Rhonda Fleming, Hope's co-star in the 1949 film The Great Lover.

By the 1960s, sales for the Hope series began to flag. The editors attempted to add some contemporary humor by introducing the character Super-Hip in issue #95. Despite the changes, the series was canceled with issue #109 (March 1968).

Artists and writers
The first four issues featured photographs of Hope on the cover; subsequent covers were illustrated. Owen Fitzgerald was the original artist for the series. He was eventually replaced by Bob Oksner, who provided the majority of the artwork for the run of the series. Oksner was replaced by Neal Adams for the final four issues.

There were no story credits, though some sources credit Cal Howard with writing some early scripts.  Beginning with issue #88 (Sept. 1964), Arnold Drake received a byline, and would go on to write most of the scripts for rest of the series run.

See also
 The Adventures of Alan Ladd
 The Adventures of Dean Martin and Jerry Lewis

References

External links 
The Adventures of Bob Hope at the Grand Comics Database
The Adventures of Bob Hope at Mike's Amazing World of DC Comics - The DC Indexes]

Comics magazines published in the United States
1950 comics debuts
1968 comics endings
Humor comics
Hope, Bob
Hope, Bob
Comics by Arnold Drake
Comics by Neal Adams
Defunct American comics
Bob Hope